The Berislavić family of Vrh Rike (also known as Berislavići Malomlački), was a Croatian noble family, a cadet branch of the Čubranić family seated in Vrh Rike. They are considered to be of White Wallachian descent, and climbed to the lesser nobility rank.

Notable members
Franjo Aleksandar, captain of Petar Zrinski

See also
Berislavić family of Trogir, Croatian noble family from Trogir

References

Vrh Rike
Medieval Croatian nobility